Tedald, Tedaldo, or Tedaldus may refer to:

Tedald of Canossa (d. 1012), Italian noble
Tedald (bishop of Arezzo) (d. 1036), son of Tedald of Canossa
Tedald (archbishop of Milan) (d. 1085)

See also
 Theudoald